The Play-offs of the 2008 Fed Cup Americas Zone Group II were the final stages of the Group II Zonal Competition involving teams from the Americas. Using the positions determined in their pools, the thirteen teams faced off to determine their placing in the 2008 Fed Cup Americas Zone Group II. The top two teams advanced to Group I for next year.

Promotion play-offs
The first placed teams of each pool were placed against each other in two head-to-head rounds. The winner of the rounds advanced to Group I for 2009.

Chile vs. Venezuela

Bolivia vs. Bahamas

Fifth to Seventh play-offs
The second-placed teams from each pool were drawn in head-to-head rounds to find the fifth and seventh placed teams.

Cuba vs. Guatemala

Ecuador vs. Dominican Republic

Ninth and Eleventh play-offs
The third-placed teams from each pool were drawn in head-to-head rounds to find the ninth and eleventh placed teams.

Panama vs. Barbados

Honduras vs. Trinidad and Tobago

Thirteenth
As there was only three teams from Pools A, B and C as opposed to the four from Pool D, the last-placed team from Pool D had no equivalent to play against. Thus the Bermudians were automatically allocated thirteenth place.

Final Placements

  and  advanced to the Americas Zone Group I for the next year. The Bahamians placed fifth overall, meaning that they were relegated back to Group II for 2010, while the Venezuelans did not compete.

See also
Fed Cup structure

References

External links
 Fed Cup website

2008 Fed Cup Americas Zone